, there were about 23,698 battery electric vehicles and 25,185 plug-in hybrid vehicles in Poland. , 4% of new cars registered in Poland were electric or plug-in hybrid.

, electric cars in Poland emit more greenhouse gas on average than gasoline-powered cars, due to the usage of coal for electricity generation.

, the Ford Mustang Mach-E was the best-selling electric car in Poland.

Charging stations
, there were 2,166 public charging station ports in Poland. , there were 660 DC charging stations in Poland.

Manufacturing
, the first electric vehicle manufacturing plant in Poland is scheduled to open in Jaworzno in 2024.

Public opinion
In a 2022 poll conducted by Santander Consumer Multirent, 23% of respondents supported having automakers only produce electric vehicles, 47% were opposed, and 29% had no opinion.

References

 
Poland
Road transport in Poland